Édouard Nzambimana (born 20 December 1945 – September 2015) was Prime Minister of Burundi from 12 November 1976 until 13 October 1978, when the post was abolished.  He then became foreign affairs minister, serving until 1982.

Prior to becoming Prime Minister, Nzambimana had been educated in Belgium and was a Lieutenant-Colonel in the army.

References

1945 births
2015 deaths
Prime Ministers of Burundi
Burundian military personnel